Encounter is an international network of active urban games. Also known as "Схватка" (reads as 'skhvatka') (translated "Combat" from Russian) – the game that gave birth to this project.

Project history 
The game rules applied today were developed by belarusian Ivan Masliukov in 2001 as part of the Skhvatka project. Ivan Masliukov was supporting the game at his own expense before the project was ceased in the end of 2001.

At the beginning of spring 2002 Ivan started seeking for donors to continue the project. Minsk internet provider "BelInfonet" company was there to sponsor the game.  By June 2002 "Skhvatka" games were resumed.

Disputes over the project arose between Ivan Masliukov and "BelInfonet".

Developers of such games like "Hunt", "Skhvatka", and "Dozor" copied the main idea of Encounter, slightly altering the format and task management.
As a result, Ivan separated from partnership with BelInfonet and created an independent Encounter project. A noteworthy fact is both parties of the conflict registered their game name trademarks "Skhvatka" and "Encounter"  in 2002 and 2004 correspondingly.

Konstantin Glushakov, who developed "Skhvatka" game application platform from scratch, headed the group of programmers who are currently working on the Encounter platform design and development.

After creation of the Encounter project Skvatka game, being one of several game formats, was called Combat.

Having gone through many stages of development, through criticism and disagreements with BelInfonet, the games labeled Encounter get held in many countries of the world: Russia, Ukraine, Belarus, Lithuania, Latvia, Moldova, Estonia, Georgia, Kazakhstan, Kyrgyzstan, Azerbaijan, United States, Czech Republic, Poland, France, Germany, Israel and many other. Currently the project involves tens of thousands of participants.

In 2008 several new urban game formats were added to the Combat and Brainstorming. These were  PhotoHunt, PhotoExtreme, WetWars, GeoCaching, Caching and Points. In 2009 VideoHunt appeared as a new game among other ones.

The same very year the first book about urban games called "Encounter. Night Extreme" written by Ivan Maslukov was issued.

The filming and processing of documentary about urban games "Encounter: lust for life" over by December 2009.

Stats 

The service platform of Encounter makes it possible to hold various urban games within a city or a country. The project covers over 230 cities in Russia and CIS, France and Germany.

Since the beginning of the project more than 8000 games have been held with over 175 000 participants, project managers say.

In 2006 Russian magazine "Kommersant" wrote:

At the end of 2009 the administration of the game network published Encounter annual report:

 a new game format Points was started and quickly gained popularity among participants (over 2000 games held)
 new game formats PhotoSearch and PhotoMuseum based on the PhotoExtreme application were started
 "Global live help" service launched
 game domains ranking system launched
 the first music video and documentary filmed
 new rewards and regulations for achieving them implemented 
 the fourth All-Russian game was held in Moscow  and the first All-Belarusian occurred in Minsk
 the first issue of General declaration appeared
 Encounter game network acted as a partner All-Russian educational forum "Seliger-2009"
 social move "Encounter for life" started up
 online store of Encounter accessories launched
 Encounter was invited to Sorbonne.

Franchise 

The territorial expansion of Encounter, like for many other projects, is carried out by means of franchising. Anyone interested can obtain the franchising sublicense to hold the games. The potential audience size doesn’t matter, as well as the presence of similar or different games organizers in the region.

Having paid one-time fixed deposit, a registered user obtains owners rights to the third level domain name in en.cx zone. Then he can organize his own game in compliance with the project regulations. For each game held, the author has to transfer fixed sum to the project owners.  This sum is determined by the game format (Combat, Brainstorming) and entry fees paid by participants. Organizer sets the rules for his games, specifies their format, timing and participants’ fees.

Most of the Encounter game organizers have other stable sources of income. Still they admit that racing and role-playing can be the main business activity for those who devote most of their time to it. The creator of Encounter Ivan Masliukov chose this option:

The annual racing and night role-playing games market capacity in Moscow is estimated to be at least 6 million roubles, Masliukov says. And it tends to increase at a rate up to 250% per year.

The Encounter founder Ivan Maslukov extends urban games not only geographically by entering new regions but also by generating and bringing to life new ideas.

Game formats 
Each game except WetWars can be played single or in teams. Every team has to have a car to reach different locations, a cell phone or a laptop connected to Internet in order to receive mission tasks, flashlights (due to the fact that most of the games are held on Saturday nights) and a set of walkie-talkie to use at places where network signal is low.

Combat 

The main goal of the game is to complete various missions in several locations sooner than the others. A team or a solo player to complete all given missions first wins the game. According to rules there is no strict sequence of missions, they are not limited in time or number. The organizers may determine all these parameters themselves. The similar game called Dozor.Classic in contrast, has strict limitations to each game. For example, there can only be 5 to 10 missions in a game, each mission is limited to 90 minutes and the hints are provided every 30 minutes with automatic mission switch.

There are informally several types of missions:

 Ordinary (logic tasks)
 Most of the time, logic tasks contain words similar to names of locations and urban objects. They can also appear as photos, maps, sketches, audio or video files.

 Orienteering (searching task)
 The aim of a searching task is to find a key or a code. The more sophisticated a game is the more complex the code is going to be. The organizers mark pointers along with aim signs or EN symbols to make it easier for the seekers to find the code. In sophisticated games a code can be placed inside a mine shaft or metallurgical works, on top of a TV tower etc.

Normally these tasks are being held at deserted buildings and desolate places. Code example: EN36ENCOUNTER or 11EN777

 Agent mission
 This mission implies finding an agent – a person who has information required to complete the mission. Organizer or third party people may act as agent(s). The task given to players contains some attributes that mark out an agent. In addition there is a description of the procedure of obtaining necessary information from agent(s). For example a player has to address an agent with a passphrase. Or the information is given in exchange to a particular item. An agent may ask players to complete a little task.

 Contest mission
 Missions can contain various contests in them. These can be held at first mission when all the teams are present or during the game process. The final competitions are conducted after all the teams complete the game or at the morning meeting. If a team succeeds in a competition, it gains extra bonus time that is subtracted from their game completion time. As an example a team has to lay the longest line out of their clothes.

 Extreme missions
 Participants who carry out this type of mission may occur in risky and harmful situations. Usually this would be a search for a code on tall buildings where one has to climb walls or walk on balconies or make way to a hard-to-reach places. The organizers claim they are highly alert about the participants’ safety during such missions, they provide players involved with the necessary guidance and safety equipment.

 "Terror"
 In these missions participants have to involve a third party (a passerby or a policeman, a salesman or a guard etc.) unaware of the game process. Agent missions are often combined with this mission type. Phone terror – calling several phone numbers to reach the right one – is a popular example.

 Coordinator's missions
 Coordinator's missions involve active work of coordinators or team analysts who provide information exchange between field players and the game server. Field players find a piece of information then pass it on to the coordinators who then process it in order to unlock another code. These tasks may be created as sublevel missions; the main goal for creating such tasks is to get non-field players more involved in the game process.

 Coordinators are not supposed to sit at home desktop or internet café. Any field player with an internet access on his/her laptop, communicator or mobile phone can be playing role of coordinator.

There are several sequences of how the game goes:

 Linear
 Every team completes missions in the same sequence they were posted on the server. This means a team cannot obtain a new mission unless the current task is complete.

 Specified (non-linear)
 Mission sequence for all teams is generated randomly to a table by default. The game organizer can also edit the mission sequence manually for each team.

 Random
 All teams get random sequences of missions. If a random sequence option is chosen, then even the organizers won’t know which sequence a team gets.

 Assault group
 The team gets all the missions at once and then it's up to them to choose the sequence. Efficient units’ allocation in this case leads a team to victory.

PhotoExtreme 

The goal is to stage several shots in compliance with preset conditions. The task has a thorough description for what is supposed to be on the photo. Basically every task is to artificially create an extreme, unusual or funny situation that has to be taken picture of. The picture quality does not count. Unlike the PhotoHunt game the main difficulty here is to figure out best way and location for pictures to be taken while the content of the picture is predetermined by the creators of the game. So in order to get the right image team has to pass the tasks given in the game. For instance find a helicopter and climb it, or let a nude person inside a bowling club; find out who can walk on water or what girl agrees to have all her hair cut.

A digital camera and internet connection is all one needs to participate.

Two or more cars, used for multitasking, are recommended.

The team that completes all the tasks first, wins. After all the pictures have been uploaded, the stage scenario developers (organizers) check the pictures’ compliance with the requirements. Depending on that, a team can get extra penalties or bonuses (regulations about extras should be indicated in the scenario). The final outcome of the game is known 6 – 24 hours after the game ends.

The idea to carry out this game originated from the classic Combat game. Similar tasks were created as bonus missions in the main game. Later on a new game format "PhotoExtreme" appeared on Encounter project. The main idea was to take a picture with the utmost accurate requirements.

Task example:

PhotoHunt 

The aim of the game is to capture a good shot. This competition is totally based on creativity. In this game a fantasy and participants’ ideas determine the outcome and time for completing the tasks doesn’t matter. The participants get several (7 to 10) tasks – each is a word or a phrase. The pictures’ content should be based on these tasks. Even though the idea of the picture is the most important thing, still the picture quality counts as well.

The most difficult is to figure out what to photograph. The place and composition are much easier. By the end of every week 20 top shots are chosen and put into the "fotoobzor" (photo review).

A digital camera and internet connection is all one needs to participate in this game.

No strict limitations on using transport – you can walk or drive.

The pictures can be judged using two systems: "Self-rating" and "Board of judges".

"Self-rating"—Teams that have participated will rate the photos taken for each task by their opponents. Of course, the team cannot rate their own pictures, but they must rate other teams' pictures.

"Board of judges"—The photos are rated by Board of judges on scale from 1 to 10. The judges are appointed and announced beforehand. Usually judges are professional photographers or creative individuals. The author of the game is included to the Board of judges.

A team or a single player who gains the biggest average score for the pictures becomes a winner.

The game became widely known because of Alexey Tkachev who has carried out PhotoHunt games on regular basis since 2004 (the 1st one in Moscow, spring 2004).

GeoCaching 

The game is quite similar to Geocaching but has time limitations and hints in it. The players receive coordinates of hidden treasures, which are hidden or buried around the city area. Each treasure is a plastic container with a code written on the bottom. Gifts from the organizers or souvenirs from teams that previously found the container may be found inside. Players search for the treasures with the help of maps and GPS navigators. When a code is found, team enters the code on the website of the game which means they found the treasure. Players may choose to take souvenirs from the container and/or place items into the container for other teams. Containers must then be put back where they were found without any clues as to their location. This means they may stay there for a long period of time.

The games can be run at any time. If the game is available after it has been completed, players are free to search for treasures out of the competition.

In order to participate, teams should have an internet access to obtain coordinates and a shovel to dig out the treasures.

There are no limitations to transport used in the game. If a game requires GPS navigation, it has to be mentioned in the rules description.

A team or a single player first to find all the treasures becomes a winner. Some additional bonus tasks may be given during the game. If completed, the team gets hints to the treasures or some additional time that may affect the results of the game.

Wet Wars 

Every participant of the game is both a hunter and a target. Participants receive their target's profiles and have to find their targets, while someone is seeking for them. As a hunter one's mission is to hunt down and make the target wet using a water-gun. As a target one has to avoid getting hunted down and wet. If a participant shot his target, he receives a "life-code" from his wet target. After entering the code on the site of the game, participant receives the profile of his victim's target. This becomes his new target. Thus the number of yet dry players declines until there are two participants hunting each other down.

The main goal is to soak as many of your targets as you can and remain dry.

Participants have to use clean water and water-guns only.

In order to participate, one has to have a virtual ID – so-called certificate.

The games usually run 24/7 for several days or weeks.

A participant has to have an internet access for obtaining his target's profile and a water-gun.

The player who soaked most of the targets in time given becomes a winner. If the number of victims hit by several hunters is even, then the time it took each player to hunt down the last victim is taken into account.

Brainstorming 

This game can be played online. It is a multiplayer mind game that is close to the Russian What? Where? When? game. Whatever domain holds the game, anyone from anywhere can play the game. These games can take place any time, but the usual time is weekends or evenings.

All you need is internet access.

Theoretically one can play using his PDA or pocket PC but in practice it's inefficient. The game can contain large media files like music, audio and video files.

The person quickest to answer all the questions becomes a winner.

These virtual games appeared along with the classic Combat games. Today these virtual games can appear as bonus tasks in the game. The command center players can complete virtual tasks to make it easier for field players to complete the main mission.

Points 

The team gets encoded points on their city map. The points are various places where organizers wrote specific codes. The mission is to calculate an optimal route, move to the next point and find the code. When the code is found, team members send it to the server to get the next point. The city limits are the game search zone. The minimum distance to be crossed should be mentioned in the game announcement.

The quickest to guess and find all the points wins.

Caching 

The teams look for hidden caches within a city or a region area. Every cache is a plastic container with a code written on the bottom. When the code is found, team members send it to the server to get the riddle for the next cache. The same tradition about souvenirs as in Geocaching applies here. The teams search for the caches following locations descriptions and by unraveling various riddles.

The first to find all the points wins. Some additional bonus tasks may be given during the game. If completed, the team gets hints to the treasures or some additional time that may affect the results of the game.

VideoHunt 

The main idea of the game is inventiveness in filming video. This competition is totally based on creativity. In this game a fantasy and participants’ ideas determine the outcome and time for completing the tasks doesn’t matter. The participants receive three to five tasks – each is a word or a phrase. The video topic should be based on these tasks. Even though the video plot is the most important thing, still the acting and directing qualities count as well.

Videos are judged similarly to how it's done in PhotoHunt.

Awards 

Since 2006 the Encounter administration has awarded participants for outstanding success in games or the project development. There are 6 types of awards: "For belief in future", "For contribution in project development", "For courage and braveness", "Champion", "Hyper-brain", "Green star".

Quotes from General declaration:

 The Encounter awards are gained by the participants for outstanding contribution in development of the project, for heroic acts, for winning local and international championships.
 The awards are established and produced by Encounter administration only. Production of fake awards is prohibited. Violators get banned from the game network.
 The awards are deputed to domain owners according to rating in domain bonus table.
 Domain owners have rights to determine the reasons for a participant or a team to be awarded (personal merits, 1st place in a local championship or a separate game).
 The network administration has the right to allocate awards for international games and competitions and also assign other reasons for awarding.

Comments 

Ivan Masliukov:

A comment by Tatiana Jurieva, a psychologist:

"Molokososy" captain Dmitry Kruchkov comments on a past game:

An opinion on Encounter as social phenomenon by a participant Eugene:

An aftergame comment by 2004 Eurovision contest winner Ruslana:

Celebrities who participated or judged games 

These are some of famous people who took part in Encounter game Ruslana, Alex Exler, Dmitry Puchkov, Ales Mukhin, Ville Haapasalo, KVN team Fyodor Dvinyatin, Yevgeni Grishkovetz, Boris Strugatsky, Diana Arbenina, Sergey Pimenov, Konstantin Rykov, Andrey Griboedov, Artur Sitdikov.

Accidents 
Night games are related with certain risks for participants. The organizers point them out in the rules of the game. Before the game every team captain hands in an agreement to the organizers. These agreements contain signatures of the participants who acknowledge and take the risks they may be subject to.
The game is rather extreme, therefore players have to be utmost careful, cautious and attentive. The list of accidents that occurred during the Encounter games:
 On October 27, 2007 two cars collided on Novosibirsk – Kolyvan highway. There were Encounter players in one of the cars. A male, female and a child lost their lives. Six people hospitalized.
 A young man died early morning on May 2 to 3 2009 in the Stary Oskol city. He was hit by electricity at a railroad bridge.
 A young man fell off the roof of closed factory in Kemerovo on the May 2, 2009.
 Two participants suffocated inside an underground collector in Lipetsk on July 12, 2009

During 2008 and 2009 there were at least five deaths in the similar game Dozor.

See also 
 City Chase
 Geocaching
 Geohashing
 Letterboxing
 Location-based game
 Questing
 Treasure hunt (game)

References

External links 
en.cx — official web site of Encounter
whirl of urban game life — interviewing Natalia Putilova, Encounter games organizer in Novosibirsk (November 19, 2009)
 Alternative intellectual pastime activities: Dozor, Encounter — Conference «A person in information society», Леньков Л.С., Московский гуманитарно экономический институт.

Puzzle hunts
Products introduced in 2004
Outdoor locating games